The National Research Council (Italian: Consiglio Nazionale delle Ricerche, CNR) is the largest research council in Italy. As a public organisation, its remit is to support scientific and technological research. Its headquarters are in Rome.

History

The institution was founded in 1923. The first president was Vito Volterra, succeeded by Guglielmo Marconi. The process of improvement of the national scientific research, through the use of specific laws, (see Law 59/1997), affects many research organisations, and amongst them is CNR, whose "primary function is to carry on, through its own organs, advanced basic and applied research, both to develop and maintain its own scientific competitiveness, and to be ready to take part effectively in a timely manner in the strategic fields defined by the national planning system".

On 23 December 1987, CNR registered the first Italian internet domain: cnr.it

Reorganisation
With the issuing of the legislative decree of 30 January 1999, n. 19, which defines "The reorganisation of the National Research Council" the central role of CNR in the Italian research system was confirmed.

In particular CNR is defined (see Article 1 of the above-mentioned decree 19/1999) as a "national research organisation, with general scientific competence and with scientific research institutes distributed across Italy, which carries out activities of primary interest for the promotion of science and the progress of the country".

CNR has the legal status of a public organisation, and defines for itself autonomous rules and regulations, in accordance with the existing laws and the Civil Code.

Mission
The new CNR has the following mission and activities:
 to promote and carry out research activities, in pursuit of excellence and strategic relevance within the national and international ambit, in the frame of European cooperation and integration; in cooperation with academic research and with other private and public organisations, ensuring the dissemination of results inside the country.
 to define, manage and coordinate national and international research programs, in the scope of its triennial plan of activity and within the framework of collaboration with universities and other private and public organisations, in addition to supporting scientific and research activities of major relevance to the nation.
 to promote the valorisation, the precompetitive development and the technological transfer of research results carried out by its own scientific network and by third parties with whom cooperative relationships have been established.
 to promote collaboration in scientific and technological fields, and in the technical regulations field, with organisations and institutions of other Countries, and with supranational organisations in the frame of extra-governmental agreements.
 to provide, upon request from government authorities, specific skills for the participation of Italy in organisations or international scientific programs of an inter-governmental nature.
 to carry out, through its own program of scholarships and research fellowships, educational and training activities in Ph.D. courses, in advanced post-university specialisation courses, and in programs of continuous or recurring education; CNR can also perform activities of non university related higher education.
 to provide supervision over those organisations designated to issue rules and regulations (see Law of 21 June 1986, n. 317), activity of dissemination of technical specifications in the frame of its institutional tasks, and, on demand, activities of certification, test and accreditation for Public Administration.
 to provide technical and scientific support to Public Administration upon their request. Within the scope of fulfilling its institutional activities, CNR can provide private law services to third parties.

For the execution of these activities and any other activity related to them, CNR can stipulate agreements and contracts, establish or participate in consortia, foundations or societies with private or public parties, Italian or foreign.

In addition, through agreements or participation, CNR can implement programs, directives and regulations for Regional government or other Public Administration, aimed to disseminate research results into the economic system; it can also contribute to the realisation of the conditions needed for the establishment of highly innovative enterprises.

Finally, CNR can participate in international research centres, in collaboration with analogous scientific institutions in other Countries.

Departments and research institutes 
CNR is organised in seven departments and 106 research institutes:

Departments 
 Biomedical Sciences
 Physical sciences and technologies of matter
 Earth system science and environmental technologies
 Chemical sciences and materials
 Engineering, ICT, energy, and transportation technologies
 Agricultural and food sciences
 Humanities and social sciences, cultural heritage

Research areas 
The "research areas" of CNR are regional centres aggregating institutions where some services are managed in a centralised manner. Conceived in 1979, the implementation phase began in the mid-eighties with the creation of the first four areas; Montelibretti, Milan, Genoa and Potenza.

Notable members

See also 
 Istituto di Scienza e Tecnologie dell'Informazione - Institute of Information Science and Technologies (ISTI) 
 Istituto per la Protezione delle Piante - Institute of Plant Protection
 Institute for Chemical-Physical Processes

References

External links
  

Science and technology in Italy
Members of the European Research Consortium for Informatics and Mathematics
Research councils
Members of the International Council for Science
Members of the International Science Council